Herman Paul Kopplemann (May 1, 1880 – August 11, 1957) was a U.S. Representative from Connecticut.

Biography 
Born in Odessa, Russian Empire, Kopplemann immigrated to the United States in 1882 with his parents, who settled in Hartford, Connecticut. He attended the grade and high schools. He engaged as publishers' agent for newspapers and magazines in 1894. He served as member of the Hartford city council 1904–1912, serving as president in 1911. He served in the State senate 1917–1920.

Kopplemann was elected as a Democrat to the Seventy-third, Seventy-fourth, and Seventy-fifth Congresses (March 4, 1933 – January 3, 1939). He was an unsuccessful candidate for reelection in 1938 to the Seventy-sixth Congress. Kopplemann was elected to the Seventy-seventh Congress (January 3, 1941 – January 3, 1943). He was an unsuccessful candidate for reelection in 1942 to the Seventy-eighth Congress.

Kopplemann was elected to the Seventy-ninth Congress (January 3, 1945 – January 3, 1947). He was an unsuccessful candidate for reelection in 1946 to the Eightieth Congress. He served as chairman of State Water Commission and Metropolitan District Commission. He died in Hartford on August 11, 1957, and was interred in Emanuel Synagogue Cemetery, Wethersfield, Connecticut.

See also
 List of Jewish members of the United States Congress

References

External links

1880 births
1957 deaths
Democratic Party Connecticut state senators
American people of Ukrainian-Jewish descent
Emigrants from the Russian Empire to the United States
Jewish members of the United States House of Representatives
Connecticut city council members
Democratic Party members of the United States House of Representatives from Connecticut
20th-century American politicians